The Fred Haigh Dam (also called Monduran Dam) is a dam in the Bundaberg Region, Queensland, Australia. It was constructed across the Kolan River in 1978 creating Lake Monduran. The dam's catchment area, north of Bundaberg in Queensland, covers 1308 km2. It is named after Frederick Haigh who was Queensland's Commissioner of Irrigation and Water Supply from 1955 to 1974. The Monduran Dam, under construction at the time of his death, was named after him upon completion.

History 

The dam was built to create a more reliable water supply for the sugarcane industry, as rainfall is not always reliable and underground water supplies were dwindling. Construction began on Saturday 13 November 1971 with a ceremony in which, Reg Swartz, Minister for National Development, initiated an explosion which blasted away tons of rock at the site and then unveiled a commemorative plaque. The dam was completed in late 1974 with the first release of water on 17 February 1975. The dam was originally to be called Monduran Dam. However, the Queensland Water Commissioner, Fred Haigh, had been a major driving force behind the dam and, following his sudden death on 15 July 1974, the Queensland Cabinet decided to rename the dam in his honour in 1979, retaining the name Monduran for the lake it created.

The dam has a capacity of 562,045 megalitres when full. The lowest level recorded was 3.29% in February 2003 during the Millennium Drought, and the highest level of 181.5% (6.86 metres over the spillway) was recorded in January 2013 as a result of heavy rains from ex Tropical Cyclone Oswald.

Spillway Upgrade
SunWater is undertaking a dam spillway capacity upgrade program to ensure the highest level of safety for the dam is maintained. The spillway will be upgraded before 2010.

Boating
There are no boating restrictions on the lake and there is a single boat ramp for boat access.

Fishing
The dam has been stocked with barramundi, silver perch, sooty grunter and red-claw crayfish with spangled perch and forktail catfish naturally present. A Stocked Impoundment Permit is required to fish in the dam.

See also

List of dams and reservoirs in Australia

References

Reservoirs in Queensland
Dams completed in 1978
Wide Bay–Burnett
Dams in Queensland
1978 establishments in Australia